Sandy Bay can refer to:

Africa
 Sandy Bay, Cape Town, South Africa
 Sandy Bay, Saint Helena

Asia
 Sandy Bay, Hong Kong, China
 Sandy Bay, Sandakan, Sabah, Malaysia

Australia
 Sandy Bay, Tasmania, Australia

Europe
 Sandy Bay, Gibraltar

North America
 Sandy Bay First Nation, Manitoba, Canada
 Sandy Bay, Manitoba (Lake Winnipeg), Canada
 Sandy Bay, Newfoundland and Labrador, Canada
 Sandy Bay (Newfoundland and Labrador), Canada
 Sandy Bay, Saskatchewan, Canada

Caribbean
 New Sandy Bay Village, Saint Vincent and the Grenadines
 Sandy Bay, Jamaica

See also 
Sand Bay (disambiguation)